The Rosalie Whyel Museum of Doll Art was an art museum in Bellevue, Washington, USA.  It featured a permanent collection of over 1,200 dolls.  The museum was founded in 1992 and won a number of awards for its collection, including the Jumeau Trophy for best private doll museum in the world.

In August 2011, the museum's owner and namesake announced that the museum would close on March 1, 2012. Five years later, the building became the new location of KidsQuest Children's Museum.

References

External links

Art museums and galleries in Washington (state)
Museums in King County, Washington
Art museums established in 1994
Art museums disestablished in 2012
1994 establishments in Washington (state)
2012 disestablishments in Washington (state)
Defunct museums in Washington (state)
Doll museums